Telen Glacier is a glacier flowing to the east side of Lutzow-Holm Bay between Telen Hill and Kjuka Headland. Mapped from air photos and surveys by Japanese Antarctic Research Expedition (JARE), 1957–62, and named after nearby Telen Hill.

See also
 List of glaciers in the Antarctic
 Glaciology

References
 

Glaciers of Queen Maud Land
Prince Harald Coast